John Barton (ca. 16141684) was an English lawyer and politician who sat in the House of Commons  in 1659 and 1660.

Barton was the son of Francis Barton of Brigstock, Northamptonshire. He entered Middle Temple in 1632 and was called to the bar in 1639. In 1659, he was elected Member of Parliament for Fowey in the Third Protectorate Parliament. He was re-elected MP for Fowey in April 1660 for the Convention Parliament. In September 1660 he became commissioner for assessment for Middlesex. He became a bencher of his inn in 1662 and a reader in 1667. In 1669 he was appointed Serjeant-at-law.

Barton married  Joan Roscarrock, daughter of Charles Roscarrock of Roscarrock, St Endellion, Cornwall before 1649 and had two sons and a daughter.

References

1614 births
1684 deaths
Members of the Parliament of England for Fowey
Members of the Middle Temple
English MPs 1659
English MPs 1660